The 2018 ATP World Tour was the global elite men's professional tennis circuit organised by the Association of Tennis Professionals (ATP) for the 2018 tennis season. The 2018 ATP World Tour calendar comprised the Grand Slam tournaments (supervised by the International Tennis Federation (ITF)), the ATP World Tour Masters 1000, the ATP Finals, the ATP World Tour 500 series, the ATP World Tour 250 series and the Davis Cup (organized by the ITF). Also included in the 2018 calendar are the Hopman Cup and the Next Gen ATP Finals, which do not distribute ranking points.

Schedule
This is the complete schedule of events on the 2018 calendar.

January

February

March

April

May

June

July

August

September

October

November

Statistical information
These tables present the number of singles (S), doubles (D), and mixed doubles (X) titles won by each player and each nation during the season, within all the tournament categories of the 2018 ATP World Tour: the Grand Slam tournaments, the ATP Finals, the ATP World Tour Masters 1000, the ATP World Tour 500 series, and the ATP World Tour 250 series. The players/nations are sorted by:
 Total number of titles (a doubles title won by two players representing the same nation counts as only one win for the nation);
 Cumulated importance of those titles (one Grand Slam win equalling two Masters 1000 wins, one undefeated ATP Finals win equalling one-and-a-half Masters 1000 win, one Masters 1000 win equalling two 500 events wins, one 500 event win equalling two 250 events wins);
 A singles > doubles > mixed doubles hierarchy;
 Alphabetical order (by family names for players).

Titles won by player

Titles won by nation

Titles information

The following players won their first main circuit title in singles, doubles or mixed doubles:
Singles
 Daniil Medvedev – Sydney (draw)
 Mirza Bašić – Sofia (draw)
 Roberto Carballés Baena – Quito (draw)
 Frances Tiafoe – Delray Beach (draw)
 Marco Cecchinato – Budapest (draw)
 Taro Daniel – Istanbul (draw)
 Márton Fucsovics – Geneva (draw)
 Mischa Zverev – Eastbourne (draw)
 Matteo Berrettini – Gstaad (draw)
 Nikoloz Basilashvili – Hamburg (draw)
 Yoshihito Nishioka – Shenzhen (draw)
 Stefanos Tsitsipas – Stockholm (draw)
 Kyle Edmund – Antwerp (draw)

Doubles
 Nicolás Jarry – Quito (draw)
 Hans Podlipnik Castillo – Quito (draw)
 Neal Skupski – Montpellier (draw)
 Jackson Withrow – Delray Beach (draw)
 Federico Delbonis – São Paulo (draw)
 Franko Škugor – Budapest (draw)
 Kyle Edmund – Estoril (draw)
 Cameron Norrie – Estoril (draw)
 Nick Kyrgios – Lyon (draw)
 Tim Pütz – Stuttgart (draw)
 Luke Bambridge – Eastbourne (draw)
 Jonny O'Mara – Eastbourne (draw)
 Marcelo Demoliner – Antalya (draw)
 Matteo Berrettini – Gstaad (draw)
 John-Patrick Smith – Atlanta (draw)
 Marcelo Arévalo – Los Cabos (draw)
 Miguel Ángel Reyes-Varela – Los Cabos (draw)
 Joe Salisbury – Shenzhen (draw)
 Jan-Lennard Struff – Tokyo (draw)
 Austin Krajicek – Moscow (draw)

Mixed doubles
 Ivan Dodig – French Open (draw)
 Alexander Peya – Wimbledon (draw)

The following players defended a main circuit title in singles, doubles, or mixed doubles:
Singles
 Roger Federer – Australian Open (draw), Basel (draw)
 Steve Johnson – Houston (draw)
 Rafael Nadal – Monte Carlo (draw), Barcelona (draw), French Open (draw)
 Alexander Zverev – Munich (draw), Washington (draw)
 John Isner – Atlanta (draw)

Doubles
 Jean-Julien Rojer – Dubai (draw), Winston-Salem (draw)
 Horia Tecău – Dubai (draw), Winston-Salem (draw)
 Jamie Murray – Acapulco (draw)
 Bruno Soares – Acapulco (draw)
 Łukasz Kubot – Halle (draw)
 Marcelo Melo – Halle (draw)
 Édouard Roger-Vasselin – Metz (draw)
 Ben McLachlan – Tokyo (draw)

Mixed doubles
 Jamie Murray – US Open (draw)

Best ranking
The following players achieved a career-high ranking this season in the top 50 (bold indicates players who entered the top 10 for the first time):
Singles

Doubles

ATP rankings
These are the ATP rankings and yearly ATP Race rankings of the top 20 singles players, doubles players and doubles teams at the current date of the 2018 season.

Singles

No. 1 ranking

Doubles

No. 1 ranking

Best matches by ATPWorldTour.com

Best 5 Grand Slam matches

Note:
Both the Wimbledon semifinal between Djokovic and Nadal, and the Australian Open men's singles final were contested in their entirety indoors despite being played at traditional outdoor events

Best 5 ATP World Tour matches

Point distribution

Retirements
Following is a list of notable players (winners of a main tour title, and/or part of the ATP rankings top 100 [singles] or top 100 [doubles] for at least one week) who announced their retirement from professional tennis, became inactive (after not playing for more than 52 weeks), or were permanently banned from playing, during the 2018 season:
  Julien Benneteau (born 20 December 1981 in Bourg-en-Bresse, France) joined the professional tour in 2000 and reached a career-high of no. 25 in singles in November 2014. He reached the quarterfinals of the 2006 French Open and the semifinals of the 2014 Cincinnati Masters. He announced that the 2018 US Open would be his last tournament, but subsequently delayed his retirement.
  Alejandro Falla (born 14 November 1983 in Cali, Colombia) joined the professional tour in 2000 and reached a career-high of no. 48 in singles. He won 11 Challengers and was also part of the Colombian Davis Cup team from 2001 to 2017. He reached the 4th round of the French Open in 2011.
 Sam Groth (born 19 October 1987 in Narrandera, Australia) joined the professional tour in 2006 and reached a career-high of no. 53 in singles and no. 24 in doubles. He won two doubles titles in 2014 and 2016. He was also part of the Australian Davis Cup team from 2014. Since 2012, he has been the fastest-serve world record holder. He announced that he would retire after the 2018 Australian Open.
 Tommy Haas (born 3 April 1978 in Hamburg, Germany) joined the professional tour in 1996 and reached a career-high of no. 2 in singles on 13 May 2002. He won the silver medal at the 2000 Summer Olympics, in addition to 15 singles titles. Having been inactive since his first round exit at the Austrian Open Kitzbühel in August 2017, Haas announced his retirement from professional tennis on 15 March 2018.
  Scott Lipsky (born 14 August 1981 in Merrick, New York, USA) joined the professional tour in 2003 and reached a career-high of no. 21 in doubles in 2013. He won 16 ATP doubles titles with six different partners. Together with Casey Dellacqua, he won the French Open Mixed Doubles event in 2011. He announced his retirement in June 2018. The 2018 French Open was his last tournament.
 Marinko Matosevic (born 8 August 1985 in Jajce, SFR Yugoslavia (present-day Bosnia and Herzegovina)) joined the professional tour in 2003 and reached a career-high of no. 39 in singles in 2013. He has never won in any singles and doubles titles in ATP matches, he won 9 Challenger titles. Having not played since February, he decided to retire his career on 29 November 2018. The 2018 Indian Wells Challenger was his last tournament.
 Florian Mayer (born 5 October 1983 in Bayreuth, Germany) joined the professional tour in 2001 and reached a career-high of no. 18 in 2011. He won 2 ATP singles titles and reached two Grand Slam quarterfinals. He announced his immediate retirement following his first round defeat to Borna Ćorić at the 2018 US Open. 
 Max Mirnyi (born 6 July 1977 in Minsk, Soviet Union (present-day Belarus)) joined the professional tour in 1996 and reached a career-high of no. 18 in singles and no. 1 in doubles in 2003. Having won 52 doubles titles, including six Grand Slam titles, Mirnyi announced his retirement from professional tennis on 29 November 2018.
 Gilles Müller (born 9 May 1983 in Luxembourg City, Luxembourg) joined the professional tour in 2001 and reached a career-high of no. 21 on 31 July 2017. He won 2 ATP singles titles and reached two Grand Slam quarterfinals. He announced that he would retire after the 2018 season, with his last match coming at the 2018 US Open.
 Daniel Nestor (born 4 September 1972 in Belgrade, Yugoslavia (present-day Serbia)) joined the professional tour in 1991 and reached a career-high of no. 1 in doubles on 19 August 2002. He won 91 ATP doubles titles, including eight Grand Slam titles and a gold medal at the 2000 Summer Olympics with Sébastien Lareau. He announced that the 2018 Davis Cup would be his last tournament.
 André Sá (born 6 May 1977 in Belo Horizonte, Brazil) joined the professional tour in 1996 and reached a career-high of no. 55 in singles and no. 17 in doubles. He won 11 doubles titles and reached the quarterfinals or better at three of the four Grand Slams in doubles. He was also a quarterfinalist at the Wimbledon Championships singles event in 2002 and a semifinalist in the 2000 Davis Cup. He announced that the 2018 Brasil Open would be his last tournament.
  Adrian Ungur (born 22 January 1985 in Pitești, Romania) joined the professional tour in 2003 and reached a career-high of no. 79 in singles on 11 June 2012 and a career-high of no. 94 in doubles on 20 July 2015. He won 1 doubles title in 2015. He announced that the 2018 Sibiu Open would be his last tournament.
  Mikhail Youzhny (born 25 June 1982 in Moscow, Soviet Union (present-day Russia)) joined the professional tour in 1999 and reached a career-high of no. 8 in singles on 28 January 2008 and a career-high of no. 38 in doubles on 11 April 2011. He won 10 singles titles and 9 doubles titles. He announced that the 2018 St. Petersburg Open would be his last tournament.

See also

2018 WTA Tour
2018 ATP Challenger Tour
Association of Tennis Professionals
International Tennis Federation

References

External links
Association of Tennis Professionals (ATP) World Tour official website
International Tennis Federation (ITF) official website

 
ATP Tour seasons
ATP World Tour